The 2005 Women's World Open Squash Championship is the women's edition of the 2005 World Open, which serves as the individual world championship for squash players. The event took place in Hong Kong from 29 November to 4 December 2005. Nicol David won her first World Open trophy, beating Rachael Grinham in the final.

Ranking points
In 2005, the points breakdown were as follows:

Seeds

Draw and results

Note: * Q = Qualifier, * w/o = Walkover, * r = Retired

See also
World Open
2005 Men's World Open Squash Championship

References

External links
World Open 2005 Squashtalk website

World Squash Championships
W
2005 in Hong Kong sport
Squash tournaments in Hong Kong
2005 in women's squash
International sports competitions hosted by Hong Kong
Squ